You Should See Me in a Crown is a debut young adult novel by Leah Johnson, published by Scholastic in June 2020. The book was given a Stonewall Book honor, and TIME magazine named it one of the best 100 young adult books of all time.

The novel follows Liz Lighty, who hatches a plan to leave the "small, rich, prom-obsessed midwestern town" she lives in because she feels 'too black, too poor, too awkward' to live her best life there.

Plot 
Liz Lighty longs to leave her hometown of Campbell, Indiana and makes plans to start a new life at the elite Pennington College, where she aims to join their world-renowned orchestra and study to become a doctor. Liz hopes to enroll at Pennington with the help of financial aid but when the aid suddenly becomes unavailable, she reluctantly decides to join a contest at her high school which awards scholarships to the prom king and queen.

Even though Liz is afraid of being the center of attention, fears the possibility of being trolled on social media and dislikes public events, she is fueled by the desire to follow her dream of attending Pennington College. When Liz finds herself falling for her prom queen competition, the bright and witty Mack, she is caught between the excitement of a new crush and the risk of losing a scholarship.

Publication history 
 United States, Scholastic Inc , 2 June 2020, Hardback

Reception 
On its release, You Should See Me in a Crown received positive reviews and temporarily sold out across various retailers. Publishers Weekly included the novel in its Children's Institute 2020: Indies Introduce Debut Authors list, Forbes profiled it during Pride month 2020, and Time cited it as a fiction book that can contribute to anti-racism work through storytelling that centers Black people. Goodreads included it in its list of Popular Queer Young Adult Fiction list for June 2020 calling it 'a self-love anthem for queer black girls everywhere.'

References

External links 
 Leah Johnson's website

2020 American novels
Young adult novels
African-American young adult novels
American LGBT novels
LGBT-related young adult novels
Scholastic Corporation books